Alburnus istanbulensis is a species of ray-finned fish in the genus Alburnus. It is endemic to Turkey, where it is found in coastal streams of Thrace and Lake Sapanca, and may also be present in the southern tributaries of the Marmara Sea.

References

istanbulensis
Endemic fauna of Turkey
Fish described in 1941